Frank Barclay may refer to:

Frank Barclay (rugby league) (1887–1959), New Zealand rugby league player
Frank Barclay (footballer), Scottish association football player